The State Savings Bank of Ukraine, or Oschadbank, is a major bank in the Ukraine. The bank is one of the largest financial institutions of Ukraine and one of three systemically important banks (including Ukreximbank and PrivatBank) nominated by National Bank of Ukraine every year since 2015 when classification requirement came into force.

, the bank had 3,650 branches and 2,850 ATMs throughout the country which carry out various functions, such as the disbursement of pensions, social aid, processing of utility payments and other banking transactions.

The head office of Oschadbank is located in Kyiv. , the bank received a net profit of UAH 2.78 billion, which is UAH 2.5 billion more than in 2019.

History
It was established by Decree of the Cabinet of Ministers of Ukraine on May 21, 1999, through the transformation of its predecessor, the State Specialized Commercial Savings Bank of Ukraine into a Joint-Stock Company.

According to the British magazine The Banker, in 2014 Oschadbank ranked 10th in the ranking of the largest banks in Central and Eastern Europe and 367th in the ranking of the top 1000 world banks.

As of the end of 2016, the bank had 3,650 branches and 2,850 ATMs throughout the country. Together with PrivatBank, Oschadbank was one of the  Ukrainian banks whose clients' time deposits are fully guaranteed by state law compared to total of ₴ 200,000 in other banks in case of bank liquidation.  (However, since martial law was declared in 2022 in response to the open, full-scale invasion of Ukraine by the Russian military, the deposit guarantee has been extended much more broadly)  

For a long time, the bank remained the only one of 74 Ukrainian banks that was not a member of the Deposit Guarantee Fund. In April 2022, the Law of Ukraine "On Amendments to Certain Laws of Ukraine on Ensuring the Stability of the Deposit Guarantee System" came into force, which aims to increase depositors' confidence in the banking system and ensure its stability. It is within the framework of this law that Oschadbank joined the DGF.

Gallery

Interesting facts 
 Former lawyer of this bank Iryna Mudra in Ukraine became later Deputy Minister of Justice of Ukraine.

See also 

List of banks in Ukraine

References

Banks of Ukraine
Companies based in Kyiv
Ukrainian brands
Ukrainian companies established in 1999
Banks established in 1999
Government-owned companies of Ukraine